A data economy is a global digital ecosystem in which data is gathered, organized, and exchanged by a network of vendors for the purpose of deriving value from the accumulated information. Data inputs are collected by a variety of actors including search engines, social media websites, online vendors, brick and mortar vendors, payment gateways, software as a service (SaaS) purveyors, and an increasing number of firms deploying connected devices on the Internet of Things (IoT). The gathered data is then passed to individuals or firms which typically take a fee. In the United States, the Consumer Financial Protection Bureau and other agencies have developed early models to regulate data economy.

Data collected and managed in the data economy must be stored on dedicated servers. These servers can be located on-premises for access from a single physical location, or off-premises. The data will reside in data centers and will remain available for access and exchange via internet-based applications, referred to collectively as the cloud. Storing and securing collected data represent a significant portion of the data economy.

Data economy categories

Big data economy 

Big data is defined as the algorithm-based analysis of large-scale, distinct digital data for purposes of prediction, measurement, and governance.

Human-driven data economy 

The human-driven data economy is a fair and functioning data economy in which data is controlled and used fairly and ethically in a human-oriented manner. The human-driven data economy is linked to the MyData Movement and is a human-centered approach to personal data management.

Personal data economy 

The personal data economy is created by individuals using personal data, which people supply either directly or indirectly. Consumers become suppliers and controllers.

Algorithm economy 

In an algorithm economy, companies and individuals can buy, sell, trade, or donate individual algorithms or apps pieces.

Transition to data economy

Market size 

The size of the EU data economy was estimated to be more than €285 billion in 2015, representing over 1.94% of the EU GDP. Key sectors in the data economy either are or are on the way to becoming data-driven. For example, the manufacturing, agriculture, automotive, smart living environments, telecommunications, healthcare, and pharma industries are at the core of the data economy.

Benefits 

Management of personal information makes everyday life easier and adds to well-being. A unified procedure opens up opportunities for user-oriented innovations and business activities.

Individuals have control over the data concerning themselves. Individuals can actively define the services and the conditions under which their personal information is used. The service providers worthy of people's trust can also get access to significantly more extensive and varied data e-services.

Challenges 

Approaches to data breaches are problematic. Challenging issues include compensation to victims, incentives for enterprises to invest in data security, and uncertainties for corporations about regulatory burdens and litigation risks. Furthermore, data portability might decrease interest in innovations.

Regulation 

The regulation of the data economy is closely linked to privacy. The present approach is flexibility, finding a balance between protecting privacy and allowing citizens to decide for themselves. The European Union GDPR regulation is one cornerstone of this new regulatory framework. A new paradigm for data governance is needed, with data ethics as a central component in all regulatory reforms.

Criticism 

The data economy raises concerns about regulatory uncertainties and incoherence, privacy, ethics, the loss of control of data, and the ownership of data and related rights. Mathematical models and algorithms based on them are too often opaque, unregulated, and incontestable.

Some concerns have been raised about internet companies controlling the flow of data and using it to gain power.

The critiques expressed in the 2012 General Data Protection Regulation (GDPR) draft of the European Commission have now led to concrete regulations:

“This is why it is time to build a stronger and more coherent data protection framework in the EU, backed by strong enforcement that will allow the digital economy to develop across the internal market, put individuals in control of their own data and reinforce legal and practical certainty for economic operators and public authorities.”

See also 
 Algorithms
 Artificial intelligence
 Blockchain
 Cloud computing
 Cloud computing security
 Data
 Data analysis
 Digital economy
 Digitization economics
 Electronic business
 Electronic commerce
 E-commerce
 GDPR
 Information economy
 Information society
 Internet of Things
 Knowledge economy
 Knowledge market
 Machine learning
 Network economy
 New economy
 Open data
 Platform economy
 Virtual economy

References

Further reading 
 Building a European Data Economy
 European Data Portal: The size and trends of the EU data economy
 Principles for a Data Economy (American Law Institute and European Law Institute)

External links 
 Human-driven data economy (Finnish Innovation Fund, Sitra)
 MyData Global Network
 Open Knowledge International

Data